Embolism may refer to:
 Embolism, when an object (the embolus) migrates from one part of the body (through circulation) and causes a blockage (occlusion) of a blood vessel in another part of the body.
Embolization is the passage of an embolus within the bloodstream, either pathologically or therapeutically.
Embolism in calendars: Intercalation (timekeeping)
Embolism (liturgy), a liturgical prayer